KK Trakai are a professional basketball club based in Trakai, Lithuania. The club currently competes in the A division of the Regional Basketball League. In 2015 the club dissolved after failing to resolve criteria given to them by the league. In 2016 they joined the B division of the Regional Basketball League and were finalists. In 2017 they moved up to the A division of the Regional Basketball League.

Club achievements 
 2011-2012 season: RKL A 2nd place
 2012-2013 season: RKL A 1st place
 2013-2014 season: NKL 2nd place
 2014-2015 season: NKL quarterfinals
 2016-2017 season: RKL B 2nd place

Notable players and coaches 
  Andrius Šležas
  Julius Kazakauskas

Trakai
Sport in Trakai
Basketball teams established in 2011
2009 establishments in Lithuania
National Basketball League (Lithuania) teams